Sacromonte National Park is a national park and protected area located in State of Mexico, Mexico.

References

National parks of Mexico
Protected areas of the State of Mexico
Protected areas of the Trans-Mexican Volcanic Belt